Straight No Chase is the second studio album by the Dungeon Family associates P.A., released 1998 via DreamWorks Records. 

The album peaked at No. 90 on Billboard'''s Top R&B Albums chart.

Critical receptionThe Record wrote that the album "incorporates live instrumentation and pure singing as a natural outgrowth of the compositions, rather than a gimmick or gesture." The Atlanta Constitution thought that "spaghetti guitars, soul and rock propel this sample-free and cinematic sophomore effort."

AllMusic called Straight No Chase'' "a brilliantly funky, unpredictable record that veers between street hip-hop, soul, rock and funk."

Track listing
 Resurrection
 Like We Do
 China White
 Crime Don't Pay
 Ecstasy
 Po Hustlin'
 Dope Stories
 Temptation
 The Lick
 10K Ho
 Whoever Who
 Reservations
 WPA Radio
 Southern Bread
 Paradise
 A Word to the Underachiever

References

1998 albums
P.A. (group) albums
DreamWorks Records albums